Athanasiu is a Romanian surname. Notable people with the surname include:

Alexandru Athanasiu (born 1955), Romanian politician and jurist
Sava Athanasiu, Romanian geologist and paleontologist
Esmeralda Athanasiu-Gardeev, Romanian pianist and composer

See also
Athanasiou
Atanasiu

Romanian-language surnames